Oleksandr Mikhailovich Polivoda (born 31 March 1987) is a Ukrainian racing cyclist, who most recently rode for UCI Continental team . He rode at the 2014 UCI Road World Championships.

Major results

2007
 1st Points classification Mainfranken-Tour
2009
 8th Gran Premio Inda
2011
 National Road Championships
3rd Road race
4th Time trial
 9th Giro del Medio Brenta
2012
 3rd Road race, National Road Championships
 4th Giro del Medio Brenta
 5th Trofeo Gianfranco Bianchin
 8th Overall Tour of Hainan
2013
 1st Stage 5 Tour of Qinghai Lake
 National Road Championships
6th Road race
10th Time trial
 10th Overall Paris–Arras Tour
2014
 1st Overall Okolo Slovenska
1st Stage 2
 1st  Mountains classification Paris–Arras Tour
 3rd Overall Tour of Qinghai Lake
1st Stage 1
 3rd Overall Five Rings of Moscow
 3rd Memorial Oleg Dyachenko
 3rd Race Horizon Park 3
 4th Race Horizon Park 1
 National Road Championships
7th Road race
10th Time trial
 7th Overall Tour of China I
 9th Tour of Almaty
2015
 1st Overall Tour of Mersin
1st Stage 1
 1st Overall Five Rings of Moscow
1st Stage 3
 Race Horizon Park
1st Maidan
6th Classic
 1st Odessa Grand Prix 1
 2nd Overall Tour of China I
 2nd Grand Prix of ISD
 2nd Memorial Oleg Dyachenko
 3rd Road race, National Road Championships
 Visegrad 4 Bicycle Race
3rd GP Czech Republic
9th GP Polski
 5th Overall Tour of Qinghai Lake
1st Stage 3
 6th Grand Prix of Vinnytsia
 8th Overall Okolo Slovenska
 9th Overall Tour of China II
2016
 National Road Championships
1st  Road race
5th Time trial
 1st  Overall CCC Tour Grody Piastowskie
1st Stage 1
 2nd Overall Tour de Hongrie
 Visegrad 4 Bicycle Race
3rd Kerékpárverseny
10th GP Polski
 6th Overall Tour of China I
 6th Tour de Ribas
 7th Overall Tour of China II
 7th Overall Tour of Bulgaria
1st Stage 4
 10th Odessa Grand Prix
2017
 National Road Championships
1st  Time trial
3rd Road race
 Tour of Qinghai Lake
1st Stages 8 & 9
 1st Stage 2 Tour of Xingtai
 2nd Overall Tour d'Azerbaïdjan
1st Stage 2
 3rd Odessa Grand Prix
 7th Overall Tour of Ukraine
1st Stage 2 (TTT)
2018
 National Road Championships
1st  Road race
5th Time trial
 Tour de Singkarak
1st  Points classification
1st  Mountains classification
1st Stage 2
 3rd Overall Tour of Cartier
 4th Grand Prix Alanya
 5th Overall Tour of Xingtai
 5th Grand Prix Side
 6th Overall Tour of Qinghai Lake
 Race Horizon Park
6th Race for Peace
10th Maidan
2019
 National Road Championships
2nd Road race
7th Time trial
 3rd Overall Tour of Quanzhou Bay
 6th Overall Tour of Xingtai
 6th Grand Prix Gazipaşa
 7th Overall Tour of Taiyuan
 9th Overall Tour of Qinghai Lake

References

External links
 
 

1987 births
Living people
Ukrainian male cyclists
Sportspeople from Kharkiv
European Games competitors for Ukraine
Cyclists at the 2015 European Games
21st-century Ukrainian people